The Seventh Sin is a 1917 American silent drama film directed by Theodore Marston and starring Shirley Mason, George LeGuere and Anna Murdock. It was the final entry into a seven film series based on the Seven Deadly Sins.

Cast

 Shirley Mason as Eve Leslie
 George LeGuere as Adam Moore
 Anna Murdock as Betty Howard
 Holbrook Blinn as Eugene D'Arcy
 Nance O'Neil as Alma
 Charlotte Walker as Margaret Brent / Sally Wells / Molly Pitcher
 H.B. Warner as Feodor / The Grand Duke

References

Bibliography
 Robert B. Connelly. The Silents: Silent Feature Films, 1910-36, Volume 40, Issue 2. December Press, 1998.

External links
 

1917 films
1917 drama films
1910s English-language films
American silent feature films
Silent American drama films
American black-and-white films
Films directed by Theodore Marston
Triangle Film Corporation films
1910s American films
English-language drama films